The Vallombrosa Altarpiece is a painting by the Italian Renaissance painter Pietro Perugino, dating to 1500–01. It is housed in the Accademia Gallery of Florence, Italy.

Description

The painting was commissioned to Perugino for the high altar of the Vallombrosa Abbey, in the Florence countryside, and was finished within July 1500. The work was originally completed by a predella, of which only two portraits remain (Biagio Milanesi, the then-abbot, and of the monk Baldassarre); both works are now at the Uffizi Gallery.

After the Napoleonic invasion of Italy and the suppression of the abbey, the canvas was moved to Paris in 1810. However, it was restored to Tuscany in 1817, being assigned to the Florentine gallery in this occasion. 

As for other Perugino's works, the panel is divided into two sections, in a pattern derived from his Assumption (now lost) of the Sistine Chapel: the upper part with God and celestial figures, and the lower one, with the saints. In the middle is the ascending Mary, enclosed within an almond which sharply ends at the lunette, in turn occupied by a blessing God surrounded by  angels.

Below are four saints, portrayed above an indeterminate hilly landscape: from left, Bernard degli Uberti, John Gualbert, Benedict and Michael Archangel. At the lower edge is the artist's signature, reading "PETRVS PERVSINVS PINXIT AD MCCCCC".

See also
San Pietro Polyptych
Ascension of Christ (Perugino)

Sources

1500 paintings
Paintings by Pietro Perugino
Paintings of the Virgin Mary
Paintings in the collection of the Galleria dell'Accademia
Paintings depicting Michael (archangel)
Angels in art
Musical instruments in art
Altarpieces
Paintings of Benedict of Nursia